The 2018 Pacific hurricane season was an event in the annual cycle of tropical cyclone formation, in which tropical cyclones form in the eastern Pacific Ocean. The season officially started on May 15 in the eastern Pacific—east of 140°W—and began on June 1 in the central Pacific—the region between the International Date Line and 140°W, and ended on November 30. These dates typically cover the period of each year when most tropical cyclones form in the eastern Pacific basin. The season began with the formation of Tropical Depression One-E, which developed on May 10, and ended with the dissipation of the season's final storm, Tropical Storm Xavier, which dissipated as a tropical cyclone on November 5.

The 2018 hurricane season was exceptionally active and featured the highest Accumulated Cyclone Energy since reliable records began in 1971. Throughout the season, 26 tropical depressions developed, 23 of which became tropical storms. A total of 13 tropical storms reached hurricane strength, and 10 hurricanes achieved major hurricane intensity. The basin saw above-average activity across all regions from the International Date Line to the west coast of Mexico and Central America. Activity peaked from early August to early October, with several long-lived and powerful hurricanes developing in that time period. Several storms severely affected land, such as Hurricane Lane in Hawaii and Hurricane Willa in Mexico. In contrast to the similarly active 2015 Pacific hurricane season, 2018 was not significantly influenced by the El Niño–Southern Oscillation. Instead, low pressures and increased sea surface temperatures associated with the Pacific Meridional Mode supported the development of these intense and long-lived storms.

Four time zones are utilized in the basin: Central for storms east of 106°W, Mountain between 114.9°W and 106°W, Pacific between 140°W and 115°W, and Hawaii–Aleutian for storms between the International Date Line and 140°W. However, for convenience, all information is listed in Coordinated Universal Time (UTC) first with the respective local time included in parentheses. This timeline includes information that was not released while the storm was active, meaning that data from post-storm reviews by the National Hurricane Center is included. This timeline documents the formation of tropical cyclones as well as the strengthening, weakening, landfalls, extratropical transitions, and dissipations during the season.

Timeline of events

May

May 10
 12:00 UTC (5:00 a.m. At the time, this was the second-earliest formation of a tropical cyclone in the Eastern Pacific proper behind Tropical Storm Adrian a year prior.
 18:00 UTC (11:00 a.m.

May 11
 18:00 UTC (11:00 a.m.

May 15
 The 2018 Eastern Pacific hurricane season officially begins.

June
June 1

 The 2018 Central Pacific hurricane season officially begins.

June 6

June 7

June 8

June 9
 18:00 UTC (1:00 p.m. CDT) at  – Tropical Depression Three-E forms about 330 mi (530 km) south of Acapulco.

June 10
 00:00 UTC (7:00 p.m. CDT, June 9) at  – Tropical Depression Three-E strengthens into Tropical Storm Bud about 305 mi (490 km) south of Acapulco.
 18:00 UTC (1:00 p.m. CDT) at  – Tropical Storm Bud intensifies into a Category 1 hurricane about 280 mi (450 km) south of Manzanillo, Colima.

June 11
 06:00 UTC (12:00 a.m. MDT) at  – Hurricane Bud intensifies into a Category 2 hurricane about 225 miles (360 km) south-southwest of Manzanillo, Colima.
 12:00 UTC (6:00 a.m. MDT) at  – Hurricane Bud intensifies into a Category 3 hurricane about 280 miles (450 km) south-southwest of Cabo Corrientes, Mexico.

June 12
 00:00 UTC (6:00 p.m. MDT, June 11) at  – Hurricane Bud reaches peak intensity with winds of 140 mph (220 km/h) and a minimum pressure of 943 mbar (hPa; 27.85 inHg), while located about 240 miles (390 km) south-southwest of Cabo Corrientes, Mexico.
 12:00 UTC (6:00 a.m. MDT) at  – Hurricane Bud weakens into a Category 3 hurricane about 230 miles (365 km) southwest of Cabo Corrientes, Mexico.

June 13
 00:00 UTC (6:00 p.m. MDT June 12) at  – Hurricane Bud weakens into a Category 1 hurricane about 310 miles (500 km) south-southeast of Cabo San Lucas, Mexico.
 12:00 UTC (6:00 a.m. MDT) at  – Hurricane Bud weakens into a tropical storm about 265 miles (430 km) south-southeast of Cabo San Lucas, Mexico.

June 14
18:00 UTC (1:00 p.m. CDT) at  – Tropical Depression Four-E develops from an area of low pressure about 140 miles (220 km) south of Acapulco, Mexico.

June 15
 02:00 UTC (8:00 p.m. MDT, June 14) at  – Tropical Storm Bud makes landfall near San José del Cabo, about 15 miles (25 km) east-northeast of Cabo San Lucas, Mexico.
 12:00 UTC (6:00 a.m. MDT) at  – Tropical Storm Bud weakens into a post-tropical cyclone about 140 miles (220 km) south-southwest of Huatabampito, Mexico.
 18:00 UTC (1:00 p.m. CDT) at  – Tropical Depression Four-E intensifies into Tropical Storm Carlotta about 80 miles (125 km) south of Acapulco, Mexico.

June 17
 00:00 UTC (7:00 p.m. CDT, June 16) at  – Tropical Storm Carlotta reaches peak intensity with winds of 65 mph (100 km/h) and a minimum pressure of 997 mbar (hPa; 29.44 inHg), located around 45 miles (70 km) southeast of Acapulco, Mexico.
 18:00 UTC (1:00 p.m. CDT) at  – Tropical Storm Carlotta degenerates into a tropical depression about 45 miles (70 km) south of Zihuatanejo, Mexico.

June 19
 00:00 UTC (7:00 p.m. CDT, June 18) at  – Tropical Depression Carlotta degenerates into a remnant low roughly 85 miles (135 km) west of Lázaro Cárdenas, Mexico.

June 24
 00:00 UTC (5:00 p.m. CDT, June 22) at  – Tropical Depression Five-E develops from an area of low pressure about 730 miles (1,175 km) southwest of the southern tip of Baja California.
 12:00 UTC (5:00 a.m. PDT) at  – Tropical Depression Five-E intensifies into Tropical Storm Daniel approximately 635 miles (1,020 km) southwest of the southern tip of Baja California.
 18:00 UTC (11:00 a.m. PDT) at  – Tropical Storm Daniel reaches peak intensity with winds of 45 mph (75 km/h) and a minimum pressure of 1004 mbar (hPa; 29.65 inHg), approximately 585 miles (940 km) southwest of the southern tip of Baja California.

June 25
 18:00 UTC (11:00 a.m. PDT) at  – Tropical Storm Daniel degenerates to a tropical depression roughly 565 miles (905 km) west-southwest of the southern tip of Baja California.

June 26
 06:00 UTC (11:00 p.m. PDT, June 25) at  – Tropical Depression Daniel degenerates to a remnant low roughly 615 miles (990 km) west-southwest of the southern tip of Baja California.

June 27
 18:00 UTC (12:00 p.m. MDT) at  – Tropical Depression Six-E forms approximately 505 miles (810 km) southwest of Manzanillo, Colima.

June 28
 12:00 UTC (6:00 a.m. MDT) at  – Tropical Depression Six-E strengthens into Tropical Storm Emilia approximately 610 miles (985 km) south of the southern tip of Baja California.

June 29
 12:00 UTC (5:00 a.m. PDT) at  – Tropical Storm Emilia attains peak intensity with winds of 60 mph (95 km/h) and a minimum pressure of 997 mbar (hPa; 29.44 inHg), roughly 610 miles (980 km) from the southern tip of Baja California.

June 30
 12:00 UTC (5:00 a.m. PDT) at  – Tropical Storm Emilia weakens into a tropical depression roughly 685 miles (1,100 km) west-southwest of the southern tip of Baja California.
 18:00 UTC (1:00 p.m. CDT) at  – Tropical Depression Seven develops from an area of low pressure approximately 560 miles (900 km) south-southwest of Manzanillo, Colima.

July
July 1
 06:00 UTC (12:00 a.m. MDT) at  – Tropical Depression Seven intensifies into Tropical Storm Fabio about 525 miles (850 km) south-southwest of Manzanillo, Mexico.

July 2
 00:00 UTC (5:00 p.m. PDT, July 1) at  – Tropical Depression Emilia weakens into a remnant low roughly 965 miles (1,555 km) west of the southern tip of Baja California.
 12:00 UTC (6:00 a.m. MDT) at  – Tropical Storm Fabio intensifies into a Category 1 hurricane roughly 690 miles (1,110 km) south of the southern tip of the Baja California Peninsula.

July 3
 06:00 UTC (11:00 p.m. PDT, July 2) at  – Hurricane Fabio intensifies into a Category 2 hurricane approximately 610 miles (985 km) southwest of the southern tip of the Baja California Peninsula.
 18:00 UTC (11:00 a.m. PDT) at  – Hurricane Fabio attains its peak intensity with maximum sustained winds of 110 mph (175 km/h) and a minimum barometric pressure of 964 mbar (hPa; 28.47 inHg) about 640 miles (1,035 km) southwest of the southern tip of the Baja California Peninsula.

July 4
 18:00 UTC (11:00 a.m. PDT) at  – Hurricane Fabio degenerates to a Category 1 hurricane roughly 810 miles (1,300 km) west-southwest of the southern tip of the Baja California Peninsula.

July 5
 06:00 UTC (11:00 p.m. PDT, July 4) at  – Hurricane Fabio weakens to a tropical storm approximately 905 miles (1,455 km) west-southwest of the southern tip of the Baja California Peninsula.

July 6
 06:00 UTC (11:00 p.m. PDT, July 5) at  – Tropical Storm Fabio degenerates to a post-tropical cyclone about 1,190 miles (1,910 km) west of the southern tip of the Baja California Peninsula.

July 26
 12:00 UTC (5:00 a.m. PDT) at  – Tropical Depression Eight-E forms roughly 1,035 miles (1,665 km) southwest of the southern tip of Baja California.
 18:00 UTC (11:00 a.m. PDT) at  – Tropical Depression Eight-E intensifies into Tropical Storm Gilma approximately 1,085 miles (1,745 km) west-southwest of the southern tip of Baja California.
 18:00 UTC (11:00 a.m. PDT) at  – Tropical Depression Nine-E forms roughly 1,435 miles (2,315 km) east-southeast of Hilo, Hawaii.

July 27

 06:00 UTC (11:00 p.m. PDT, July 26) at  – Tropical Storm Gilma reaches peak intensity with winds of 45 mph (75 km/h) and a pressure of 1005 mbar (hPa; 29.68 inHg), while located approximately 1,210 miles (1,945 km) west-southwest of the southern tip of Baja California.
 18:00 UTC (11:00 a.m. PDT) at  – Tropical Storm Gilma degenerates into a tropical depression approximately 1,375 miles (2,215 km) west-southwest of the southern tip of Baja California.

July 28
 00:00 UTC (5:00 p.m. PDT, July 27) – Tropical Depression Nine-E dissipates roughly 1,210 miles (1,945 km) southeast of Hilo, Hawaii.

July 29
 12:00 UTC (5:00 a.m. PDT) at  – Tropical Depression Gilma degenerates to a remnant low roughly 1,150 miles (1,850 km) east of Hilo, Hawaii.

July 31
 12:00 UTC (5:00 a.m. PDT) at  – Tropical Depression Ten-E develops from an area of low pressure about 805 miles (1,295 km) southwest of the southern tip of Baja California.

August
August 1
 00:00 UTC (5:00 p.m. PDT, July 31) at  – Tropical Depression Ten-E intensifies into Tropical Storm Hector approximately 845 miles (1,360 km) southwest of the southern tip of Baja California.

August 2
 12:00 UTC (5:00 a.m. PDT) at  – Tropical Storm Hector intensifies into a Category 1 hurricane approximately 1,090 miles (1,750 km) west-southwest of the southern tip of Baja California.
 18:00 UTC (11:00 a.m. PDT) at  – Hurricane Hector intensifies into a Category 2 hurricane while located roughly 1,155 miles (1,860 km) west-southwest of the southern tip of Baja California.

August 3
 12:00 UTC (5:00 a.m. PDT) at  – Hurricane Hector degenerates to a Category 1 hurricane while located roughly 1,340 miles (2,160 km) west-southwest of the southern tip of Baja California.
 18:00 UTC (11:00 a.m. PDT) at  – Hurricane Hector re-intensifies into a Category 2 hurricane while located roughly 1,400 miles (2,255 km) west-southwest of the southern tip of Baja California.

August 4
 00:00 UTC (5:00 p.m. PDT, August 3) at  – Hurricane Hector intensifies into a Category 3 hurricane approximately 1,455 miles (2,345 km) west-southwest of the southern tip of Baja California.
 18:00 UTC (1:00 p.m. CDT) at  – Tropical Depression Eleven-E forms from an area of low pressure approximately 270 miles (435 km) south-southeast of Puerto Angel, Oaxaca.

August 5
 12:00 UTC (5:00 a.m. CDT) at  – Tropical Depression Eleven-E intensifies into Tropical Storm Ileana approximately 170 miles (275 km) south-southeast of Puerto Angel, Oaxaca.
 12:00 UTC (7:00 a.m.
 18:00 UTC (11:00 a.m. PDT) at  – Hurricane Hector intensifies into a Category 4 hurricane approximately 1,250 miles (2,015 km) east-southeast of South Point, Hawaii.

August 6
 00:00 UTC (6:00 p.m.
 06:00 UTC (08:00 p.m. HST August 5) at  – Hurricane Hector enters the Central Pacific Hurricane Center's (CPHC) area of responsibility.
 12:00 UTC (5:00 a.m. CDT) at  – Tropical Storm Ileana peaks with winds of 65 mph (100 km/h) and a minimum pressure of  approximately 170 miles (490 km) southeast of Manzanillo, Mexico.
 18:00 UTC (08:00 a.m. PDT) at  – Hurricane Hector reaches peak intensity with winds of 155 mph (250 km/h) and a minimum pressure of  approximately 890 miles (1,430 km) east-southeast of Hilo, Hawaii.
 18:00 UTC (11:00 a.m.
 18:00 UTC (11:00 p.m.

August 7
 00:00 UTC (5:00 p.m.
 12:00 UTC (5:00 a.m. CDT) – Tropical Storm Ileana is absorbed by Hurricane John.
 12:00 UTC (6:00 a.m.
 18:00 UTC (12:00 p.m.

August 8
 06:00 UTC (12:00 a.m.
 12:00 UTC (02:00 a.m. HST) at  – Hurricane Hector weakens into a Category 3 hurricane approximately 260 miles (420 km) south-southeast of Hilo, Hawaii.

August 9
 12:00 UTC (5:00 a.m.

August 10
 06:00 UTC (11:00 p.m.
 06:00 UTC (08:00 p.m. HST, August 9) at  – Hurricane Hector re-strengthens into a Category 4 hurricane approximately 385 miles (620 km) east of Johnston Island.
 18:00 UTC (11:00 p.m.

August 11
 06:00 UTC (08:00 p.m. HST, August 10) at  – Hurricane Hector weakens into a Category 3 hurricane approximately 130 miles (215 km) north-northeast of Johnston Island.
 12:00 UTC (5:00 a.m.
 18:00 UTC (08:00 a.m. HST) at  – Hurricane Hector degenerates into a Category 2 hurricane approximately 210 miles (335 km) north-northwest of Johnston Island.

August 12
 12:00 UTC (02:00 a.m. HST) at  – Hurricane Hector weakens into a Category 1 hurricane approximately 320 miles (520 km) southeast of Midway Island.
 12:00 UTC (5:00 a.m.

August 13
 00:00 UTC (02:00 p.m. HST, August 12) at  – Hurricane Hector degenerates into a tropical storm approximately 285 miles (455 km) south-southeast of Midway Island.
 18:00 UTC (08:00 a.m. HST) at  – Tropical Storm Hector crosses the International Dateline and enters the Japan Meteorological Agency's area of responsibility.

August 15
00:00 UTC (5:00 p.m.
12:00 UTC (5:00 a.m.

August 17
00:00 UTC (5:00 p.m.
12:00 UTC (5:00 a.m.

August 18
00:00 UTC (5:00 p.m.
06:00 UTC (11:00 p.m.

August 19

00:00 UTC (2:00 p.m. HST, August 18) at  – Hurricane Lane enters the CPHC's area of responsibility.
06:00 UTC (8:00 p.m.

August 21
00:00 UTC (2:00 p.m.

August 22
00:00 UTC (2:00 p.m.
06:00 UTC (8:00 p.m.
12:00 UTC (2:00 a.m.

August 24
00:00 UTC (2:00 p.m.
12:00 UTC (2:00 a.m.
18:00 UTC (8:00 a.m.

August 25
06:00 UTC (8:00 p.m.

August 26
06:00 UTC (11:00 p.m.
12:00 UTC (2:00 a.m.
12:00 UTC (5:00 a.m.

August 27
12:00 UTC (2:00 a.m.

August 28

00:00 UTC (2:00 p.m.
12:00 UTC (5:00 a.m.
18:00 UTC (11:00 a.m.

August 29
00:00 UTC (2:00 p.m.
18:00 UTC (11:00 a.m.
18:00 UTC (11:00 a.m.

August 30
00:00 UTC (2:00 p.m. HST, August 29) at  – Hurricane Miriam enters the CPHC's area of responsibility.
06:00 UTC (11:00 p.m.
12:00 UTC (5:00 a.m.
18:00 UTC (11:00 a.m.

August 31
18:00 UTC (8:00 a.m.
18:00 UTC (11:00 a.m.

September
September 1

00:00 UTC (5:00 p.m. PDT, August 31) at  – Tropical Depression Seventeen-E forms about 365 mi (590 km) southeast of Socorro Island.
06:00 UTC (8:00 p.m.
06:00 UTC (11:00 p.m.
17:30 UTC (7:30 a.m. While the system was assessed as subtropical by the Central Pacific Hurricane Center, the National Oceanic and Atmospheric Administration's Satellite Products and Service Division analyzed it as a tropical storm through the Dvorak technique.
18:00 UTC (8:00 a.m.
23:30 UTC (1:30 p.m.

September 2
00:00 UTC (5:00 p.m. PDT, September 1) at  – Tropical Depression Seventeen-E strengthens into Tropical Storm Olivia about 230 mi (370 km) south of Socorro Island.
12:00 UTC (2:00 a.m.
12:00 UTC (5:00 a.m.
17:30 UTC (7:30 a.m.
18:00 UTC (8:00 a.m.

September 3
5:30 UTC (7:30 p.m.
06:00 UTC (11:00 p.m.
18:00 UTC (11:00 a.m.

September 4
00:00 UTC (5:00 p.m.
00:00 UTC (2:00 p.m. HST, September 3) at  – Hurricane Norman crosses into the Central Pacific Hurricane Center's area of responsibility.
00:00 UTC (5:00 p.m. PDT, September 3) at  – Tropical Storm Olivia intensifies into a Category 1 hurricane approximately 120 mi (195 km) southwest of Clarion Island.
12:00 UTC (5:00 a.m. PDT) at  – Hurricane Olivia rapidly intensifies into a Category 2 hurricane about 215 mi (345 km) west-southwest of Clarion Island.
18:00 UTC (11:00 a.m. PDT) at  – Hurricane Olivia rapidly intensifies into a Category 3 hurricane about 275 mi (440 km) west-southwest of Clarion Island.

September 5

00:00 UTC (5:00 p.m. PDT, September 4) at  – Hurricane Olivia reaches its initial peak intensity with winds of 125 mph (205 km/h) and a pressure of 954 mbar (hPa; 28.17 inHg) approximately 335 mi (540 km) west-southwest of Clarion Island.
12:00 UTC (2:00 a.m.
12:00 UTC (5:00 a.m. PDT) at  – Increasing wind shear causes Hurricane Olivia to weaken to a Category 2 hurricane approximately 470 mi (760 km) west-southwest of Clarion Island.

September 6
12:00 UTC (5:00 a.m. PDT) at  – Hurricane Olivia unexpectedly re-intensifies into a Category 3 hurricane approximately 780 mi (1,255 km) west of Clarion Island.
18:00 UTC (8:00 a.m.

September 7
00:00 UTC (5:00 p.m. PDT, September 6) at  – Hurricane Olivia further intensifies into a Category 4 hurricane and reaches its peak intensity with winds of 130 mph (215 km/h) and a minimum pressure of 951 mbar (hPa; 28.08 inHg) about 950 mi (1,525 km) west of Clarion Island.
06:00 UTC (8:00 p.m.
06:00 UTC (11:00 p.m. PDT, September 6) at  – Hurricane Olivia weakens to a Category 3 hurricane about 1,035 mi (1,665 km) west-northwest of Clarion Island.
12:00 UTC (5:00 a.m. PDT) at  – Hurricane Olivia further degenerates to a Category 2 hurricane approximately 1,120 mi (1,800 km) west-northwest of Clarion Island.
18:00 UTC (8:00 a.m.

September 8
06:00 UTC (11:00 p.m. PDT, September 7) at  – Hurricane Olivia degenerates to a Category 1 hurricane about 1,250 mi (2,010 km) east-northeast of Hilo, Hawaii.
06:00 UTC (12:00 a.m.

September 9
00:00 UTC (2:00 p.m.
00:00 UTC (2:00 p.m. HST, September 8) at  – Hurricane Olivia enters the Central Pacific Hurricane Center's area of responsibility.
00:00 UTC (5:00 p.m.
18:00 UTC (11:00 a.m.

September 10
12:00 UTC (2:00 a.m.

September 11
06:00 UTC (8:00 p.m. HST, September 10) at  – Hurricane Olivia weakens to a tropical storm approximately 375 mi (605 km) northeast of Hilo, Hawaii.
06:00 UTC (11:00 a.m.

September 12

00:00 UTC (5:00 p.m.
19:10 UTC (9:10 a.m. HST) at  – Tropical Storm Olivia makes landfall on the Hawaiian island of Maui, just northwest of Kahului, with winds of 45 mph (75 km/h). This marks the first known instance of a tropical cyclone making landfall on the island.
19:54 UTC (9:54 a.m. HST) at  – After crossing the ʻAuʻau Channel, Tropical Storm Olivia makes a second landfall just northwest of Lanai City, Lanai with winds of 45 mph (75 km/h). This is also marks the first time a tropical cyclone made landfall on the island.

September 13
06:00 UTC (8:00 p.m. HST, September 12) at  – Tropical Storm Olivia weakens to a tropical depression about 150 mi (240 km) southwest of Honolulu, Hawaii.
18:00 UTC (8:00 a.m. HST) at  – Tropical Depression Olivia briefly reorganizes into a tropical storm about 340 mi (550 km) southwest of Honolulu, Hawaii.

September 14
06:00 UTC (8:00 p.m. HST, September 13) at  – Tropical Storm Olivia degenerates into a remnant low about 485 mi (785 km) southwest of Honolulu, Hawaii.

September 19

12:00 UTC (6:00 a.m. MDT) at  – Tropical Depression Nineteen-E develops from an elongated trough just east of Loreto, Baja California Sur over the Gulf of California. This marks the first known instance of a tropical cyclone forming within the Gulf of California since the National Hurricane Center's records began in 1949.

September 20
00:00 UTC (8:00 p.m. The National Hurricane Center noted in its final report that the system may have briefly become a tropical storm before landfall but data were inconclusive.
03:00 UTC (11:00 p.m. MDT, September 19) at  – Tropical Depression Nineteen-E makes landfall at peak strength between Ciudad Obregón and Guaymas.
06:00 UTC (2:00 a.m.

September 25
 06:00 UTC (12:00 a.m.
 12:00 UTC (6:00 a.m.

September 26
 12:00 UTC (6:00 a.m.

September 27
 12:00 UTC (6:00 a.m.
 18:00 UTC (11:00 a.m.

September 28

 00:00 UTC (5:00 p.m.
 06:00 UTC (11:00 p.m.
 18:00 UTC (11:00 a.m.

September 29
 00:00 UTC (5:00 p.m.
 12:00 UTC (7:00 a.m.
12:00 UTC (2:00 a.m. HST) at  – A tropical depression develops approximately 505 mi (815 km) south-southwest of Ka Lae, Hawaii.
18:00 UTC (8:00 a.m. HST) at  – The tropical depression intensifies into Tropical Storm Walaka about 540 mi (870 km) south-southwest of Ka Lae, Hawaii.

September 30
 06:00 UTC (11:00 p.m.
18:00 UTC (8:00 a.m. HST) at  – Tropical Storm Walaka strengthens into a Category 1 hurricane about 800 mi (1,285 km) south-southwest of Honolulu, Hawaii.

October
October 1
00:00 UTC (5:00 p.m.
06:00 UTC (8:00 p.m. HST, September 30) at  – Hurricane Walaka rapidly intensifies into a Category 2 hurricane about 895 mi (1,440 km) southwest of Honolulu, Hawaii.
12:00 UTC (2:00 a.m. HST) at  – Hurricane Walaka rapidly intensifies into a Category 3 hurricane about 925 mi (1,490 km) southwest of Honolulu, Hawaii.
18:00 UTC (8:00 a.m. HST) at  – Hurricane Walaka rapidly intensifies into a Category 4 hurricane about 885 mi (1,425 km) southwest of Kauai, Hawaii.

October 2

00:00 UTC (5:00 p.m.
00:00 UTC (6:00 p.m.
00:00 UTC (2:00 p.m. HST, October 1) at  – Hurricane Walaka's rapid intensification culminates with it becoming a Category 5 hurricane about 905 mi (1,455 km) southwest of Kauai, Hawaii. Concurrently, it reaches its peak intensity with maximum winds of 160 mph (260 km/h) and a minimum pressure of 921 mbar (hPa; 27.20 inHg).
11:00 UTC (5:00 a.m.
12:00 UTC (6:00 a.m.
12:00 UTC (2:00 a.m.
18:00 UTC (12:00 p.m. MDT) – Tropical Depression Rosa dissipates over the Baja California peninsula.
18:00 UTC (12:00 p.m.

October 4
00:00 UTC (5:00 p.m.
06:00 UTC (11:00 p.m.
06:00 UTC (8:00 p.m.
06:20 UTC (8:20 p.m.
18:00 UTC (8:00 a.m.

October 5
00:00 UTC (5:00 p.m.
00:00 UTC (2:00 p.m.
06:00 UTC (8:00 p.m.

October 6
12:00 UTC (2:00 a.m.

October 7
12:00 UTC (5:00 a.m.
18:00 UTC (8:00 a.m.

October 8
00:00 UTC (5:00 p.m.

October 9

18:00 UTC (11:00 a.m.

October 12
12:00 UTC (6:00 a.m. MDT) at  – Tropical Storm Sergio makes landfall near Los Castros, Baja California Sur.
18:00 UTC (12:00 p.m.
18:00 UTC (12:00 p.m.

October 13
00:00 UTC (6:00 p.m. MDT, October 12) – Tropical Depression Sergio dissipates inland over Mexico.

October 14
 12:00 UTC (7:00 a.m.

October 15
 06:00 UTC (1:00 a.m.

October 16
 00:00 UTC (7:00 p.m.
 18:00 UTC (1:00 p.m.

October 19
 06:00 UTC (1:00 a.m.
 18:00 UTC (1:00 p.m.

October 20

00:00 UTC (7:00 p.m.
12:00 UTC (7:00 a.m.
 18:00 UTC (1:00 p.m.

October 21
06:00 UTC (12:00 a.m.
12:00 UTC (6:00 a.m.
18:00 UTC (12:00 p.m.

October 22
00:00 UTC (6:00 p.m.
06:00 UTC (12:00 a.m. This marks the third time a Pacific hurricane season featured three Category 5 hurricanes since reliable records began, tying the record set in 1994 and 2002.
12:00 UTC (6:00 a.m.

October 23
06:00 UTC (12:00 a.m.
06:00 UTC (1:00 a.m.
13:30 UTC (7:30 a.m. CDT) at  – Tropical Depression Vicente makes landfall near Playa Azul, Mexico.
17:45 UTC (11:45 a.m. MDT) – Hurricane Willa passes over the Islas Marías archipelago with maximum winds of 115 mph (185 km/h); its eyewall traverses the islands of San Juanito and María Madre.
18:00 UTC (1:00 p.m. CDT) – Tropical Depression Vicente dissipates inland over Mexico.

October 24
01:20 UTC (8:20 p.m. CDT, October 23) at  – Hurricane Willa makes landfall with winds of 115 mph (185 km/h) and a pressure of  near Palmito del Verde, Sinaloa.
06:00 UTC (1:00 a.m.
12:00 UTC (7:00 a.m. CDT) – Tropical Storm Willa dissipates over northeastern Mexico.

November

November 2
 12:00 UTC (6:00 a.m.

November 3
 00:00 UTC (6:00 p.m.

November 4
 12:00 UTC (6:00 a.m.

November 6
 00:00 UTC (5:00 p.m.

November 30
 The 2018 Pacific hurricane season officially ends.

Notes

See also

 List of Pacific hurricanes
 Pacific hurricane season
 Timeline of the 2018 Atlantic hurricane season

References

External links

The National Hurricane Center's advisory archive for 2018

2018 Pacific hurricane season
Pacific hurricane meteorological timelines
Articles which contain graphical timelines